Captured is the 1985 studio album follow-up to singer-songwriter Rockwell's gold album, Somebody's Watching Me. Despite featuring one single featuring Stevie Wonder and another appearing on the soundtrack of The Last Dragon, it was a commercial and critical disappointment.

Background
As Rockwell had done on his previous album, he solicited the help of another prominent recording artist to sing with him on the first single.  Instead of Michael Jackson, however, this time he got Stevie Wonder to record the song "He's a Cobra"  with him. The song was a flop.

The next single, "Peeping Tom" appeared on the soundtrack to The Last Dragon, but it too was a disappointment.

In late 2021, the album became available on iTunes for the first time.

Track listing
"Peeping Tom" (Rockwell, Janet Cole, Antoine Green) - 4:31
"He's a Cobra" (Curtis Anthony Nolen, Peter Rafelson) - 4:33
"T.V. Psychology" (Robbie Nevil, Mark Holding) - 4:10
"We Live in a Jungle" (Curtis Anthony Nolen, Ron Aniello, Gardner Cole) - 3:48
"Captured (By An Evil Mind)" (Rockwell, Janet Cole, Tony LeMans) - 5:19
"Don't It Make You Cry" (Rockwell) - 5:22
"Tokyo" (Curtis Anthony Nolen, John Duarte, Frank Busey) - 5:34
"Costa Rica" (Curtis Anthony Nolen, John Duarte, Frank Busey) - 4:33

Personnel
Rockwell - lead and backing vocals, keyboards, synthesizers
Brenda K. Pierce, Gregory Alexander, Julia Waters, Mark Holding, Maxine Waters, Melody McCully, Oren Waters, Pam Vicente, Robbie Nevil, Lamotte Smith, Stevie Wonder - backing vocals
John Duarte, John Van Tongeren, Peter Rafelson, Randy Kerber, Raymond Crossley - keyboards, synthesizers
Curtis Anthony Nolen - guitars, keyboards, synthesizers
Robbie Nevil, TJ Parker - guitars
Michael Dunlap, Neil Stubenhaus - bass
John Robinson - acoustic and electronic drums and percussion, Simmons Drums
Dan Higgins, Terry Harrington - saxophone
Bill Reichenbach, Bob Payne - trombone
Chuck Findley, Gary Grant, Jerry Hey - trumpet

Production
Executive Producer: Ray Singleton
Producer: Curtis Anthony Nolen and Rockwell for Super Three Productions
Recording Engineers: Bob Robitalle, Curtis Anthony Nolen, Rockwell, Steve Smith; assisted by Karen Siegel, Michael Dotson and Ralph Sutton
Mixed by Russ Terrana and Steve Smith
Mastered by John Matousek

References

1985 albums
Rockwell (musician) albums
Motown albums